Plymouth Congregational Church may refer to:

 Plymouth Congregational Church (New Haven, Connecticut), listed on the NRHP in New Haven, Connecticut
 Plymouth Congregational Church (Miami, Florida), listed on the NRHP in Miami, Florida
 New Plymouth Congregational Church (New Plymouth, Idaho), listed on the NRHP in Payette County, Idaho
 Plymouth Congregational Church (Lawrence, Kansas), listed on the NRHP in Douglas County, Kansas
 Plymouth Congregational Church (Syracuse, New York), listed on the NRHP in Syracuse, New York
Plymouth Congregational Church (Charleston, South Carolina), established at Avery Institute, the historic original church building is now a residence

See also
 Plymouth Church (Brooklyn)
 Plymouth Church Seattle